César Pérez may refer to:

 César Pérez (athlete) (born 1975), Spanish steeplechase runner 
 César Pérez (footballer) (born 2002), Chilean football midfielder
 César Pérez Sentenat (1896–1973), Cuban pianist and composer
 César Pérez Vivas (born 1957), Venezuelan lawyer and politician, Governor of Táchira